P. hastatus may refer to:
 Parasenecio hastatus, a flowering plant species
 Phyllostomus hastatus, the greater spear-nosed bat, a mammal species from South and Central America

See also 
 Hastatus (disambiguation)